Sings the Country Music Hall of Fame Hits, Vol. 2 is the 11th album by Jerry Lee Lewis released on Smash Records in 1969.

Background
The album concludes producer Jerry Kennedy's concept of having Lewis record standards from the country music genre, further cementing his new reputation as a country music artist. Since his comeback single "Another Place, Another Time" in 1968, Lewis had enjoyed a successful commercial run with four top five country hits, and this streak continued when the Eddie Dean song "One Has My Name (The Other Has My Heart)" was released as a single and climbed to number three. Like Vol. 1, its sequel features covers of classic country songs by the likes of Hank Williams, Don Gibson, and Jim Reeves, as well as a duet with Jerry Lee's sister Linda Gail Lewis. It was not quite as successful as its predecessor, peaking at number five on the Billboard''' country albums chart. The decision to record two albums worth of older country hits in a two-day session had more to do with Lewis fulfilling his contractual obligations for 1969 (three albums) rather than being necessitated by a lack of new material. Indeed, as Colin Escott points out in the liner notes to the retrospective The Killer: The Smash/Mercury Years, "Every music publisher in Music City was trying to get the ear of Jerry Lee Lewis and Jerry Kennedy."  In his 2009 biography, Jerry Lee Lewis: Lost and Found'', Joe Bonomo laments that "the swift recordings of made-to-order arrangements didn't allow Jerry Lee much of an opportunity for nuance."

Track listing

1969 albums
Jerry Lee Lewis albums
Albums produced by Jerry Kennedy
Smash Records albums